The Amarnath Express is an Express train belonging to North Eastern Railway zone that runs between  and  in India. It is currently being operated with 15097/15098 train numbers on a weekly basis.

Service

The 15097/Amarnath Express has an average speed of 48 km/hr and covers 1781 km in 36h 45m. The 15098/Amarnath Express Express has an average speed of 51 km/hr and covers 1781 km in 35h 15m.

Route and halts 

The important halts of the train are:

Coach composition

The train has standard LHB rakes with a max speed of 130 kmph. The train consists of 22 coaches:

 1 AC II Tier
 6 AC III Tier
 9 Sleeper coaches
 1 Pantry Car
 3 General Unreserved
 2 EOG

Traction

Both trains are hauled by a Gonda Loco Shed-based WDM-3A diesel locomotive from Bhagalpur to Jammu and vice versa.

Rake sharing

The train shares its rake with 12587/12588 Gorakhpur–Jammu Tawi Amarnath Superfast Express.

See also 

 Bhagalpur Junction railway station
 Jammu Tawi railway station
 Amarnath Express
 Gorakhpur–Jammu Tawi Amarnath Superfast Express

Notes

References

External links 

 15097/Amarnath Express India Rail Info
 15098/Amarnath Express India Rail Info

Transport in Bhagalpur
Transport in Jammu
Express trains in India
Rail transport in Uttar Pradesh
Rail transport in Bihar
Rail transport in Uttarakhand
Rail transport in Haryana
Rail transport in Punjab, India
Rail transport in Jammu and Kashmir
Named passenger trains of India